Agyneta breviceps is a species of sheet weaver found in Finland. It was described by Hippa & Oksala in 1985.

References

breviceps
Spiders described in 1985
Spiders of Europe